Kajetan Georg von Kaiser (5 January 1803 – 28 August 1871) was a German chemistry professor, researcher and inventor.

Biography
He was born at Kelheim on the Danube, in Bavaria, on 5 January 1803. He was appointed professor of technology at the University of Munich in 1851, and in 1868 became professor of applied chemistry at the Technical University Munich.
 
His scientific researches into the chemistry of fermentation are of importance; a saccharometer invented by him in 1842 serves for the determination of the percentages of the contents of wort.
 
He died at Munich, 28 August 1871.

Writings
In addition to articles in scientific journals, he published the paper "Ueber Bieruntersuchungen und Fehler, welche dabei gemacht werden können" about researches into beer and their errors (Munich, 1846).
 
He also brought out the scientific works of his friend, the chemist and mineralogist Johann Nepomuk von Fuchs (d. 1856), under the title "Gesammelte Schriften des Joh. Nep. von Fuchs" (Munich, 1856), adding an obituary notice of that scientist.

Sources
 

19th-century German chemists
German science writers
19th-century German inventors
Science teachers
Academic staff of the Ludwig Maximilian University of Munich
Academic staff of the Technical University of Munich
1803 births
1871 deaths
German male non-fiction writers